Atlantic Avenue may refer to:

Highways
 Atlantic Avenue (Boston) in Massachusetts
 Atlantic Avenue (New York City) in Brooklyn and Queens, New York
 Florida State Road 806 in Palm Beach County, locally known as Atlantic Avenue
 Atlantic Avenue in Atlantic City, New Jersey, one of the city's many streets used in the game of Monopoly
 Atlantic Boulevard (Los Angeles County), known as Atlantic Avenue for several miles of its length

Commuter rail
 Atlantic Avenue Tunnel in Brooklyn, now a historic site, opened in 1844
 Atlantic Avenue station (Tri-Rail), a proposed commuter rail station in Delray Beach, Florida

Subway stations
Atlantic Avenue – Barclays Center (New York City Subway), a station complex at Flatbush and Fourth Avenues in Brooklyn, consisting of:
Atlantic Avenue – Barclays Center (IRT Eastern Parkway Line); serving the  trains
Atlantic Avenue – Barclays Center (BMT Brighton Line); serving the  trains
Atlantic Avenue – Barclays Center (BMT Fourth Avenue Line); serving the  trains
Atlantic Avenue (BMT Fifth Avenue Line); demolished
Atlantic Avenue (BMT Canarsie Line), a station at Van Sinderen Avenue in Brooklyn; serving the  train

See also
Atlantic Boulevard (disambiguation)
Atlantic station (disambiguation)